La Calle de los amores ("The Street of Love") is a 1954 Mexican film. It stars Carlos Orellana.

Cast
 Luis Beristáin
 Victorio Blanco	
 Armando Calvo	
 Jorge Casanova
 Felipe de Flores
 Teresa de Sevilla
 Rafael Estrada
 Jacqueline Evans	
 Esther Fernández	
 Maria Antonieta Herrera
 María Herrero
 Juan José Hurtado	
 José Luis Jiménez
 Cecilia Leger
 Álvaro Matute
 Carlos Orellana
 Elda Peralta
 Lilian Plancarte
 Beatriz Ramos
 Raúl Ramirez
 Emma Roldán	
 Raphael J. Sevilla
 Virginia Sánchez Navarro

External links
 

1954 films
1950s Spanish-language films
Mexican black-and-white films
Films directed by Raphael J. Sevilla
1950s Mexican films